Nuruzzaman is a name of Arabic origin composed of the elements Nur, al- and Zaman, meaning light of the era. It may refer to:

Quazi Nuruzzaman (1925–2011), Bangladeshi military officer
Mohammad Nuruzzaman (born 1974), Bangladeshi cricketer
Nuruzzaman (Khulna cricketer), Bangladeshi cricketer
Nuruzzaman (Barisal Division cricketer) (born 1994), Bangladeshi cricketer